Welburn is a village and civil parish in the Ryedale district of North Yorkshire, in England, 2 miles south west of Kirkbymoorside and about 24 miles from York. The population of the parish was estimated at 60 in 2012. As the population of the civil parish was less than 100 it was not separately counted in the 2011 census and was included with the civil parish of Wombleton.

The Slingsby Aviation works and airstrip lie south-east of the village.

Welburn was historically a township in the parish of Kirkdale and became a civil parish in 1866. In 1870–72, John Marius Wilson's Imperial Gazetteer of England and Wales described Welburn like this:

"WELBURN, a township in Kirkdale parish, N. R. Yorkshire; 5 miles E of Helmsley. Acres, 1,582. Real property, £2,846. Pop., 121. Houses, 20."

Welburn Hall 
Built during the 17th century, Welburn Hall was originally a lath and plaster structure, becoming the home of the Strangeway family. A following owner, Sir John Gibson, High Sheriff of Yorkshire (1630–31), built a substantial stone addition to the original building. The Hall again passed to new owners by way of Elizabeth, daughter and heiress of Thomas Robinson Esquire of Welburn who married Rev. Digby Cayley. Their three daughters and co-heiresses married into the families of Rev. Francis Wrangham, Archdeacon of Cleveland, Thomas Smith, M.D., and Rev. Arthur Cayley, rector of Normanby, who were in possession in 1824. Mrs. Wrangham held the manor in 1857 followed by William Ernest Duncombe, the Earl of Feversham, in 1872. During the 19th century, Welburn Hall, originally a fine specimen of Elizabethan architecture, was in a state of decay having remained unoccupied from about 1850 to 1880 when Joseph Heads, a brick and tile maker, became the occupant.  “In 1890, the derelict hall was sold, the west wing was demolished and the present house and stables were built.” The 1901 census is more precise than earlier records. Notably, Welburn Hall was occupied by colliery owner, John Shaw JP, his wife, Mary, his son, James Edward Shaw, Adela, wife of James and John's three grandchildren, Beatrice, Geoffrey and John Edward Durrant Shaw. Eleven household servants are also recorded. The Hall's new coach house was occupied by the coachman, William Scholey, and his wife, Elizabeth.  The “Hall Farm” was operated by Frederick Parker and his two employees.  “In 1931, the house was badly damaged by a fire and was subsequently rebuilt in a less ostentatious style”. The above-mentioned, Major John Edward Durrant Shaw (1894–1952), son of James Edward Shaw (1869-c.1962), became High Sheriff of Yorkshire from 1939 to 1940. During the First World War Welburn Hall was a convalescent hospital for injured soldiers and in the Second World War it housed children who were evacuated from the Adela Shaw hospital in Kirkbymoorside. It was opened as a school on 26 January 1951, by North Riding County Council.   Dr Howard Crockatt, who was a surgeon at the Adela Shaw Hospital in Kirkbymoorside, played a key role in instigating the school's beginnings and many children went from the hospital to the school.

A separate classroom block was later adapted from the existing stables and garages to provide seven classrooms. The North Riding council built a school hall in 1970 and a craft/technology room was added by North Yorkshire County Council in 1976. Welburn Hall now caters for children and young people aged eight to 19 who have a range of special educational needs.

Early Welburn Families

Potter and Franklin 
Richard Potter was born in 1786 and became a miller occupying Howkeld Mill.
In 1784, William Franklin was born in Welburn. He worked as a cartwright and in 1861, he was lodging with another carpenter, John Clarke, who was employing 3 apprentices.

Parker, Snowdon and Foxton 
Thomas Parker (1744–1817), who was probably born in Edmundbyres, Durham, appeared in Yorkshire during the mid-18th Century.  He married Hannah Boyes (1754–1841) who was born in Wombleton and they took up farming in Welburn.
Christopher Foxton (1745–1810) and his wife, Ann Hodgson, farmed 200 acres. By 1840, their son, John Foxton (1773–1835) and Grace Brown (1783–1835) had taken over this farm. John and Grace were born in Welburn and married in 1803. The widowed Grace and her two sons, Richard Foxton (born 1817) and Hartas Foxton (1822–1904)continued to run the farm through the 1850s. By 1861, Hartas had taken over Welburn Grange.
Leonard Snowdon (born 1764) followed by Mathew Snowdon (1795–1851) occupied West Ings. The Parker, Foxton and Snowdon families became intertwined by marriage during the 1800s, producing many descendants who contributed to the growth and prosperity of Yorkshire and beyond. Thomas Parker and Hannah Boyes produced five children:

 Thomas Parker married Jane Winspear 
 Elizabeth [aka. Betty] Parker married Joseph Worthy
 Margaret [aka. Peggy] Parker married William Foxton
 John Parker married Ann Richardson
 Joseph Parker married Lavinia Fenwick

During the 1840s and 1850s, the three Parker brothers were tenant farmers on individual acreages and occupied adjacent homes in Welburn Village. They produced twelve sons and eight daughters in total. Thomas Parker and Jane Winspear's son, another Thomas Parker (1811–1897), married Jane Foxton and worked as a cattle jobber in nearby Wombleton. This couple produced seven sons and five daughters. Their move back to Welburn possibly coincided with the death of Thomas' father in 1853 and by 1881, Thomas and Jane, now "cattle dealers", had moved to Sonley Hill, Welburn. Hartas Foxton was born in Welburn in 1822. By 1861, he occupied Welburn Grange with his wife, Elizabeth, farming 210 acres and employing six servants.

John (Jack) Parker (1822–1890), son of John Parker and Ann Richardson, became the original Sinnington Huntsman. He was described as an eccentric character "whose witty anecdotes are still remembered". Jack Parker is also noted as the legendary huntsman who "blooded" the Viscount of Helmsley.

According to available records, Frederick Parker (1833–1912), son of Thomas Parker and Jane Foxton, is the only Parker to have a direct connection to Welburn Hall. During the 1860s and 1870s, Frederick and Jane Snowdon were farming 150 acres at nearby Muscoates.  By 1881, Frederick and his second wife, Mary, were farming 113 acres in Welburn. West Ings, a 234-acre farm, adjacent to Welburn Hall, was the birthplace of Frederick's former wife, Jane Snowdon. In 1881, West Ings was occupied by her brother, William Snowdon and his wife, Hannah. By 1901, Frederick Parker was again a widower, farming Welburn Hall acreage until about 1910. He moved to Wombleton where he died in 1912.

In 1859, Joseph and Thomas Parker, sons of Thomas Parker and Jane Foxton, left Welburn intent upon making their fortune. By 1860, they had arrived in Port Chalmers, New Zealand aboard the Ocean Chief and soon after headed to the gold diggings at Gabriel's Gully. Like many before them, Thomas and Joseph must have found slim pickings because they eventually returned to farming, this time on New Zealand's South Island. Thomas did not marry. He became a successful horse breeder often travelling to Australia to sell his stock. Joseph married Catherine Buchanan Crerar. They had five sons and two daughters, thus establishing the Parker family in New Zealand. In the fledgling New Zealand society, the Parker brother's tales about their former life at "Parker Castle" must have made impressive dinner conversation. No doubt the 'castle' was a tongue-in-cheek referral to Welburn Hall.

Barthram 
William Barthram was born in Stockerley in 1772 and during the early 1800s he moved to Welburn. He became the publican and also farmed 80 acres. His sons, Samuel Barthram and John Barthram, were born about 1811. They remained in Welburn and both became Blacksmiths. John and his wife, Bessy, produced 4 sons and three daughters and by 1861, John was a blacksmith, tanner and farmer of 72 acres. William Barthram's third son, Richard Barthram (1813–1874), married Mary Parker (1818–1907) daughter of Thomas Parker and  Jane Winspear.

Lancaster & Flowers 
Hebden Flowers (born 1790) occupied the 85 acre "Starfits Grange" farm. William Lancaster (1812–1878) was born in Wombleton and he married Elizabeth Flowers who was born in Welburn in 1824. They lived in Starfits Lane and continued to work the farm. Their daughter, Annie Lancaster, was born about 1853 and she married Nimrod Parker (1847–1888), son Thomas Parker and Jane Foxton.

Featherstone and Walker 
In the early 1840s, William Featherstone farmed Sonley Hill. Also during this period, William Walker (born 1796), his wife, Elizabeth Walker and 12 children occupied Welburn Grange. By the late 1850s, Hartas Foxton and his wife Elizabeth (1823–) had possession of the Grange with the help of six servants.

References

External links

Rydale council list

Villages in North Yorkshire
Civil parishes in North Yorkshire